Ram Raja Prasad Singh (1936 – 12 September 2012) was a Nepalese politician. In July 2008, Singh was proposed by the Communist Party of Nepal (Maoist), a Nepalese political party which merged with other communist parties and renamed to Communist Party of Nepal (Maoist-Centre) , or CPN(M-C) as their candidate in the first presidential election in the country.

Singh hailed from Saptari district, eastern Nepal. His father, Jaya Mangal Prasad Singh was a wealthy landowner. Singh's first encounter with the realities of political life came abruptly at the age of seven. In 1942 the Indian socialist leaders Jayprakash Narayan and Ram Manohar Lohia came to Nepal to mobilise support for the Quit India Movement and organise the formation of a guerrilla army to fight against British colonial rule. The two stayed at Singh's household. One day Lohia and Narayan, along with three other comrades, were caught by Nepalese police and their weaponry was seized. Singh's father and the remaining guerrilla soldiers attacked the detention centre and freed the two Indian leaders. Jaya Mangal Prasad Singh was later arrested and sentenced for the killing of two policemen during the raid. Ram Raja Prasad Singh and his brother Laxman were made to stay in jail with their father. They were released after India became independent.

Ram Raja Prasad Singh went on to study law. Once, whilst studying at Delhi University, he was able to meet with the Latin American revolutionary leader Che Guevara. Guevara advised Singh to take up guerrilla struggle in Nepal. Singh is probably the only Nepalese politician who met with Guevara.

Singh, a young Supreme Court lawyer, contested one of the four graduate seats in the 1971 Rastriya Panchayat election. Singh won the seat on a platform of restoring parliamentary democracy in Nepal, and his victory was seen as a humiliation of the regime. Whilst several other candidates for the graduate seats had declared their wish for gradual democratic reforms (17 candidates contested on a common reformist platform), Singh was the sole candidate to call for immediate transition to democracy.

The presiding officer of the Rastriya Panchayat was reluctant to let Singh be sworn in along with the other members of the assembly. He was arrested by plainclothes policemen inside the lobby of the assembly. A special tribunal sentenced him. On August 26, 1971, he was given a royal pardon and could later be sworn in as a member of the Rastriya Panchayat. After his release, Singh continued to be a vocal advocate of democratic change and began organising public meetings in different parts of the country.

In 1976 he established Nepal Janabadi Morcha (Nepal Democratic Front), a left-wing political movement in Nepal.

Singh claimed responsibility for the 1985 bombings in Kathmandu. He was convicted of the bombings and his property was confiscated by the government. However, Singh escaped Nepal and went into exile in India. At least eight people were killed, including a member of parliament. In the capital, the blasts went off near the royal palace, at the deluxe Hotel de l'Annapurna owned by the royal family, Singh Durbar, the prime minister's office, and parliament. Bombs also went off at the Bhairahawa airport, Nepalganj and Mahendranagar in the west as well as Birgunj, Janakpur, Biratnagar and Jhapa in the east.

He returned to Nepal in 1990.

Singh died on 12 September 2012 during the course of his treatment at the Tribhuvan University Teaching Hospital (TUTH) in the capital Kathmandu. He was 77 years old.

References

1936 births
2012 deaths
Nepal Janabadi Morcha politicians
People sentenced to death in absentia
People from Saptari District
Delhi University alumni
Madhesi people
Candidates for President of Nepal